The State of Maine Armory (also known as Portland Armory and now as Portland Regency Hotel & Spa) is an historic building in Portland, Maine's Old Port District. The State of Maine Armory was designed by prominent local architect Frederick A. Tompson and built in 1895 for use by the Maine National Guard. Upon its opening, the then-mayor of Portland, James Phinney Baxter, said: "The possession of quarters in a prominent place, where the men would always be under the public eye, would be the means of improving the morale of the force." In 1941, the National Guard abandoned the building, but it was used to house troops during World War II as well as a recreation center. After the war, the structure was used as a warehouse until it was converted into the current hotel in 1987.

The main-floor restaurant is named eighteen95, as a nod to the year the building was completed. Its basement-level lounge, meanwhile, is named The Armory. A whiskey bar, Ironside, was added on the lobby level during renovations in 2020 (Portland Armory supplied the USS Constitution, nicknamed Old Ironsides, with ammunition).

The 2020 renovation followed one in 2012 that cost around $2.8 million.

The hotel is a member of Historic Hotels of America.

References

External links 

 

Hotels in Portland, Maine
Armories in Maine
Infrastructure completed in 1895
1895 establishments in Maine
Historic Hotels of America